Dutra is a Portuguese language surname.

It may refer to:

People
 Amalia Dutra (born 1958), Uruguayan scientist
 Antônio Monteiro Dutra (born 1973), known as Dutra, a Brazilian football left back
 Diana Dutra (born 1964), boxer from Vancouver, Canada
 Eurico Gaspar Dutra (1883–1974), Brazilian marshal, politician, and president
 Janaína Dutra, Brazilian lawyer and activist
 José Dutra dos Santos (born 1948), known as Dutra, a Brazilian footballer and manager
 Luis Dutra Jr., a Brazilian professional mixed martial artist
 Olin Dutra (1901–1983), golfer on the PGA Tour in the 1920s and 1930s
 Olívio Dutra (born 1941), Brazilian politician
 Randal M. Dutra, visual effects artist
 Rogério Dutra da Silva, a Brazilian professional tennis player
 Sérgio Dutra Santos, known as Serginho or Escadinha, a Brazilian professional volleyball player
 Tiago Dutra (born 1990), Brazilian football midfielder
 Tom Dutra (born 1972), American soccer goalkeeper and goalkeeper coach

Places
 Astolfo Dutra, a Brazilian municipality in the state of Minas Gerais
 Cidade Dutra (district of São Paulo), a district within the city of São Paulo
 Presidente Dutra, Maranhão, a Brazilian municipality in the state of Maranhão
 Presidente Dutra, Bahia, a Brazilian municipality in the state of Bahia
 Vicente Dutra, a Brazilian municipality in the state of Rio Grande do Sul

Other uses
 Rodovia Presidente Dutra, known as Via Dutra, a federal highway in Brazil
 , a Hungarian tractor brand produced between 1943–1972

Portuguese-language surnames